Vinītaruci (died 594) was an Indian Buddhist monk who preached in China and Vietnam.

He came to Changan in 573 and spent seven years in China. In 580 he came to support the preaching of Buddhism in Vietnam, being notable as one of the first direct influences on Vietnam in the History of Buddhism in India and in the development of Vietnamese Thiền or Chinese Chán Zen Buddhism in Vietnam. He is known in Vietnam as Tì-ni-đa-lưu-chi (from the Sino-Vietnamese transcription of the Sanskrit 毘尼多流支) and also by the Chinese Sino-Vietnamese name Diệt Hỉ (滅喜) in Chinese-language texts of Vietnamese Buddhism. He was from Oḍḍiyāna, traditionally identified as a place in the Swat valley.

References

Thiền Buddhists
Indian Buddhist monks
6th-century Indian monks
594 deaths
Year of birth unknown